Kim Dong-jun (born February 11, 1992), also known as just Dongjun, is a South Korean singer and actor. He debuted as member of boy group ZE:A (and later its subgroup ZE:A Five and ZE:A J). Apart from his group's activities, he has established himself as an actor, notably through his participation in various television dramas such as The Fugitive of Joseon (2013), Neighborhood Lawyer Jo Deul-ho (2016), Black (2017) and About Time (2018). He has also starred in films such as A Company Man (2012), Take My Hand (2014), and Dead Again (2017).

Career

ZE:A

Kim entered a nine-membered group called "Children of Empire". In 2009, they started in Mnet "Children of Empire" and "Children of Empire Returns", where they tour the country doing guerilla performances. Later the group faced controversy in December following the similarities of the group's name to Brown Eyed Girls' JeA. The group later changed the pronunciation of the name to avoid implications. On January 7, 2010, the group debuted with their EP, Nativity under the name ZE:A.

ZE:A J solo project has released solo track for Kevin, Heechul and Dongjun. Dongjun was the last member to release solo track "Healing" on May 3. The track was composed and written by himself.

Other activities
Kim made many appearances in Let's Go Dream Team Season 2 as a Dream Team member.

Kim won two gold medals in the Idol Athletes Chuseok Special on August 27, 2011, in men's 100 meter and 110 meter hurdles against other idols.

Kim was appointed as a torch bearer at the 17th Asian Incheon Games 2014.

2017–present 
In June 2017, Kim joined Gold Moon Entertainment after his contract with Star Empire Entertainment ended. The CEO of his new agency was ZE:A's former manager, Hwang Jung-moon. In August 2017, it was reported that Gold Moon Entertainment, The Vibe Entertainment and Asakusa Games had merged and now operate under the name "Major 9."

In July 2017, it was reported that Kim was set to star OCN's new drama, Black, portraying a second generation chaebol.

In May 2018, Kim starred on tvN's drama About Time portraying a musical director who is known for his genius abilities, but lacks humanity.

Kim has been a cast member of the TV show Delicious Rendezvous since December 2019.

Personal life 
Kim enlisted as an active duty soldier on July 12, 2021. He completed basic military training in first place and was selected as a special warrior. Currently, he’s serving as an assistant instructor at the Korea Army Training Center.

While serving in the military, Kim appeared in the 5th episode of tvN variety program The Backpacker Chef which aired on June 23, 2022. At that time, he had been promoted to a corporal and was serving as an assistant in the 1st Infantry Recruit Training Battalion. He was discharged on January 11, 2023.

Discography

Songs

Filmography

Films

Television series

Variety shows

Musical

Awards

References

External links 
 
 

1992 births
Living people
People from Busan
Male actors from Busan
Musicians from Busan
South Korean pop singers
South Korean male idols
South Korean male television actors
South Korean male film actors
21st-century South Korean  male singers
South Korean male musical theatre actors
South Korean male stage actors